Meriania grandiflora is a species of plant in the family Melastomataceae. It is found in Costa Rica and Panama. It is threatened by habitat loss.

References

grandiflora
Vulnerable plants
Taxonomy articles created by Polbot